John Moir may refer to:
 John Moir (basketball) (1915–1975), American basketball player
 John William Moir (1851–1940), African Lakes Corporation
 John Moir (politician) (1856–1939), Western Australian politician
 John Moir (settler) (1851–1939), Western Australian settler and pastoralist
 John Moir (physician) (1808–1899), Scottish physician
 John Moir (priest) (1814–1889), Scottish Episcopalian priest